Spurius Postumius Albinus Regillensis was a Roman politician, of patrician family, of the early 4th century BC. He was elected a military consular tribune in 394 BC, and carried on the war against the Aequians.  He at first suffered a bloody defeat, after which rumours reached Rome that he had been killed and his forces destroyed near Tusculum. But the news of his defeat had been overstated, and Postumius and his men afterwards conquered the Aequian force, completely wiping them out.

See also
 Postumia gens

References

4th-century BC Romans
Roman consular tribunes
Regillensis, Spurius